The 2022–23 Belgian National Division 1 will be the seventh season of the third-tier football league in Belgium and the first one in which U23 teams are admitted into the league, causing an expansion from 16 to 20 teams, although the previous season had been played with only 15 teams due to the last minute bankruptcy of Roeselare.

Team information

Team changes

Out
Two teams moved to another level:
 Dender EH was promoted as champions of the previous season.
 La Louvière Centre was relegated after finishing last. They were the only team relegated as the previous season was played with one team less due to the bankruptcy of Roeselare, and Mandel United remained in the league after winning the Belgian Division 2 Promotion play-offs.

In
Three teams were promoted from the 2021–22 Belgian Division 2:
 Ninove, runner-up of the Belgian Division 2 VV A as champions Sparta Petegem did not apply for a licence.
 Hoogstraten, winners of the Belgian Division 2 VV B.
 RAAL La Louvière, winners of the Belgian Division 2 ACFF.

Four U23 teams were added to the league as it was expanded. The teams joining were determined based on their finishing position in the 2021–22 Belgian U23 league:
 Jong KAA Gent
 OH Leuven U-23
 Young Reds Antwerp
 Zébra Élites Charleroi

Regular season

League table

Results

Number of teams by provinces

References

Belgian National Division 1
Bel
3
Current association football seasons